Juraj Mikúš (born 22 February 1987) is a Slovak professional ice hockey centre currently playing for HC Nové Zámky of the Slovak Extraliga.

He was originally drafted 121st overall by the Montreal Canadiens in the 2005 NHL Entry Draft.

Playing career
In the 2008–09 season for HK 36 Skalica of the Slovak Extraliga, he created a powerful tandem with Žigmund Pálffy and reached the mark of 75 assists, eclipsing the league record formerly belonging to Pavol Demitra. His team reached the finals for the first time, where it lost to HC Košice.

In the summer of 2010, Mikus was invited to Spartak Moscow's training camp, but he failed to make the team because of the import quota. Instead, in late September he joined Dinamo Riga of the Kontinental Hockey League (KHL). On 29 November he was released from Dinamo Riga but, as Martin Cibak and Jaroslav Obsut had been released from Spartak, he rejoined them. He then played a few games for Lev Poprad but finished the rest of the 2011–12 season with TPS Turku of the SM-Liiga. In the summer of 2012, he signed with HC Lev Praha of the KHL.

After splitting the 2017–18 season, between HC Slovan Bratislava and HC Litvínov in the Czech Extraliga, Mikus opted to extend his tenure in the ELH, agreeing to a three-year optional contract with Litvínov on May 18, 2018.

Career statistics

Regular season and playoffs
Bold indicates led league

International

Awards and honors

References

External links 

1987 births
Living people
Sportspeople from Skalica
Montreal Canadiens draft picks
Slovak ice hockey centres
HK 36 Skalica players
Chicoutimi Saguenéens (QMJHL) players
HC '05 Banská Bystrica players
Manchester Monarchs (AHL) players
Dinamo Riga players
HC Spartak Moscow players
HC Lev Poprad players
HC TPS players
HC Lev Praha players
HC Slovan Bratislava players
HC Olomouc players
HC Litvínov players
HKM Zvolen players
HC Nové Zámky players
Slovak expatriate ice hockey players in Canada
Slovak expatriate ice hockey players in the United States
Slovak expatriate ice hockey players in the Czech Republic
Slovak expatriate ice hockey players in Finland
Expatriate ice hockey players in Latvia
Slovak expatriate sportspeople in Latvia
Slovak expatriate ice hockey players in Russia